C. fulgida may refer to:

 Calamagrostis fulgida, a South American grass
 Canna fulgida, a garden plant
 Cavia fulgida, a guinea pig
 Charidea fulgida, a New World moth
 Chrysaora fulgida, a jellyfish with four oral arms
 Chrysis fulgida, a cuckoo wasp
 Cicindela fulgida, a tiger beetle
 Cingulopsis fulgida, a sea snail
 Cyclaspis fulgida, a hooded shrimp
 Cylindropuntia fulgida, a cholla cactus